Shane Balkowitsch (born January 24, 1969) is an American  wet plate photographer from Bismarck, North Dakota. Balkowitsch was given the name "Maa'ishda tehxixi Agu'agshi" ("Shadow Catcher") by Calvin Grinnell of the Hidatsa-Mandan-Arikara Nation on October 28, 2018. The subject of his photos is the human condition. Since 2012 he has photographed over 3,500 individuals, including various celebrities and historical figures. Balkowitsch is a self-taught photographer.

Photographic career
In 2012, Balkowitsch began researching the process of wet plate photography after reading a manual on the subject by tintype photographer John Coffer. With little experience in photography, Balkowitsch experimented with the process and took his first successful photo the same year. Since then he has produced over 2,000 plates and his work has appeared in numerous publications. He holds demonstrations in North Dakota with the use of a portable darkroom.

Techniques
Balkowitsch uses an Italian made Alessandro Gibellini 8x10" folding camera in the studio. He uses Carl Zeiss Tessar 300mm and 360mm lenses. Since 2012 studio sessions required 4500 watts of continuous light. For outdoor sessions the sunlight is enhanced with the help of reflectors. In 2018 Balkowitsch opened a new photography studio in Bismarck, North Dakota where natural light is exclusively used in studio.

Recognition
 Wet plates by Balkowitsch have been permanently curated by the State Historical Society of North Dakota.
 Balkowitsch photographs have been featured in various art exhibits.
 In 2016 Balkowitsch received the Rising Star Award from Bismarck State College.

 In 2016 The Smithsonian Institution acquired from Balkowitch his wet plate portrait photograph of boxing champion Evander Holyfield. Indexing of the portrait was finalized by the Smithsonian in 2018. The portrait is now part of the National Portrait Gallery, object number NPG.2017.3
 On October 28, 2018 Balkowitsch was given the name "Maa'ishda tehxixi Agu'agshi" by Calvin Grinnell of the Hidatsa-Mandan-Arikara Nation. The English translation of the name is Shadow Catcher.
 On June 23, 2019 Balkowitsch was honored by state officials from North and South Dakota and New Mexico for recreating and preserving Native American culture through wet plate photos.
 On December 1, 2019 a photo of Swedish climate activist Greta Thunberg created by Balkowitsch at the Standing Rock Indian Reservation in North Dakota on October 8, 2019 was archived at the Library of Congress in Washington D.C.
 In November, 2019 the documentary film “Balkowitsch” debuted at the North Dakota Human Rights Film Festival.  The film is directed by Greg DeSaye and Chelsy Ciavarella and examines the life and work of Shane Balkowitsch. The film's official release date is March 27, 2020.
 After receiving threats of vandalism in February 2020 in response to plans by Balkowitsch and a local Bismarck business owner to display a seven-foot mural of Balkowitch’s work featuring Swedish climate activist Greta Thunberg titled Standing For Us All, communities across the globe responded by displaying and projecting the image on various structures.

Projects and exhibits

Murderer's Gulch, A non-historical Wet Plate Collaboration

In 2016 Balkowitsch set out to create an homage to the famous 1887 New York photo by Jacob Riis called the "Bandits Roost."  The objective was to get the look and feel in the present day using the historic collodion process with his models wearing very non-historical clothing. The recreation project took place in East Alley near 423 E Broadway Ave in Bismarck, North Dakota on June 11. About 100 individuals volunteered to assist in the project volunteering hey, wood, props, costumes, and as actors for the image. The final glass plate, titled, "Murderer's Gulch" is being curated by the Historical Society of North Dakota in their permanent archive.

Dakota Access Pipeline dispute by Standing Rock Native community

On August 15, 2016, Balkowitsch travelled to Cannon Ball, ND, to capture images of the Dakota Access Pipeline protests. The pipeline is to run less than one mile from the Standing Rock Indian Reservation of North Dakota and South Dakota. One of only a few photographers allowed at the scene of the protest, Balkowitsch captured images of the protesting encampment. The protest included many people Balkowitsch met during work on a photography project for the Historical Society of North Dakota, Northern Plains Native Americans: A Modern Wet Plate Perspective. The 2017 documentary film Awake: A Dream from Standing Rock by director Josh Fox features a wet plate by Balkowitsch of Floris White Bull who also appears in the film. The 2018 documentary film Peacekeeper also includes and credits wet plate images taken by Balkowitch during the Dakota Access Pipeline protests. In 2019 Balkowitschs' work No Spiritual Surrender was awarded Best Photograph by the North Dakota Human Rights Art Festival.

The Persecution of Complete Strangers

A performance art event performed on August 27, 2016, The Persecution of Complete Strangers is a modern expression of a current event influenced by past images to visually express the continued xenophobia and resulting crimes against perceived enemies. The images are inspired by William Mortensen. The exhibit was created, directed, and photographed by Balkowitsch and dedicated to the memory of Hande Kader, a Turkish transgender woman whose body was found raped, mutilated, and burned by the roadside in the Zekeriyaköy up-market on August 12, 2016. It is part of the global outcry and protests against the hate, mistreatment, and irrational fear of transgender people.

The Mask Series, A Five Year Wet Plate Collodion International Collaboration
The Mask Series was started by Balkowitsch in 2012 after taking a very simple collodion image of a vintage Czech M10 gas mask and a wilting flower. He called the plate 'The Last Flower'. The goal for this series is to raise awareness of the historic wet plate technique as an art form.  This will allow artists that normally do not have a chance to share their work to participate in a collaborated effort with other artists from around the world. Once an artist decides to participate and take up the challenge of creating an original work,  a gas mask is sent to them.  The artist then produces a wet plate collodion image of any size or type that works best for them. The Series is expected to be completed in 2017.

Northern Plains Native Americans Series, A Modern Wet Plate Perspective

Northern Plains Native Americans Series is an ongoing wet plate project inspired by the works of 19th Century wet plate photographers Mathew Brady, Edward S. Curtis, and Orlando Scott Goff. The first wet plate in the series is "Eternal Field," a 2014 wet plate photograph of Ernie Lapointe, the Great Grandson of Sitting Bull. The goal of the series is to capture one-thousand 8x10" black glass ambrotypes of Native American communities and individuals. On November 3, 2017, the Bismarck Art Galleries Association hosted the reception of Balkowitsch’s photograph series, "Northern Plains Native Americans: A Modern Wet Plate Perspective." In 2019 Balkowitsch published "Northern Plains Native Americans: A Wet Plate Perspective," the first volume of a multi-volume set that includes photographs from this series. On June 23, 2019 U.S. Rep. Debra Haaland, one of the first Native American women elected to the U.S. Congress, appeared as guest speaker at the photographer's book signing event in Bismarck. In 2021 Balkowitsch's plates of U.S. Rep. Debra Haaland appeared in the Fall 2021 issue of Sierra Magazine, including the cover image.

Nostalgic Glass, A Natural Light Wet Plate Studio

In 2018 Balkowitch opened a new photography studio in Bismarck, North Dakota. The studio took two years to plan and eight months to construct. According to Balkowitch, Nostalgic Glass is the first natural light wet plate studio built from the ground up in North America in over 100 years.

Liberty Trudges Through Injustice, A Wet Plate Collodion Collaboration

Liberty Trudges Through Injustice, is a wet plate image created by Balkowitsch resulting from a collaboration event that took place in Bismarck, North Dakota on July 21, 2018. The collaboration was directed by Balkowitsch and inspired by the painting Liberty Leading the People by Eugène Delacroix.

Nokota Horses, The Horse in North Dakota
Works by Balkowitsch were included in the "Horse in North Dakota" exhibit hosted by the North Dakota Heritage Center. The Nokota Horse Conservancy helps to preserve this breed of horse. Nokota Horse Conservancy promoters believe these horses are the descendants of those once owned by the Plains Indians. Today, there are approximately 800 worldwide.

Northern Plains Native Americans: A Personal Collection
On August 25, 2018 the Rourke Art Museum hosted an exhibit called "Northern Plains Native Americans: A Personal Collection" that featured various works by Balkowitsch from his "Northern Plains Native Americans Series" collection.  Balkowitsch also provided demonstrations on the art of traditional wet plate photography during the event.

The Throne of Gods: A Wet Plate Collaboration
On July 20, 2019 Balkowitsch brought together more than 45 artists to recreate the 18th century painting 'The Olympians' by artist Nicolas-Andre Monsiau. The project took Balkowitsch more than 8 months to plan and is his largest collaboration project to date.

No Vaccine for Death: A Wet Plate Collaboration

On July 17, 2021 more than 100 collaborators came together at the University of Mary’s Marian Grotto in Bismarck, North Dakota to create one of the largest wet-plate photographic collaborations in history. The final image, called 'No Vaccine for Death' was inspired by the painting 'Triumph of Death' by Pieter Bruegel the Elder, circa 1562.

Controversy

Standing For Us All
In February 2020 a seven-foot mural of the work Standing For Us All by Balkowitsch was going to be displayed on the side of a bakery business in Bismarck, North Dakota. A Bismarck TV station reported on the planned mural and threats of vandalism and boycotts from the community followed. The mural Liberty Trudges Through Injustice by Balkowitsch and on display in Bismarck since the Spring of 2019 was vandalized on February 13, 2020.  Standing For Us All is an image showing Swedish climate activist Greta Thunberg looking off into the distance taken by Balkowitsch during Thunberg’s visit to Standing Rock Indian Reservation in October 2019. After plans to display the mural were cancelled in Bismarck, a former Fargo, North Dakota city commissioner spearheaded plans to bring the mural to the eastern North Dakota city. The mural of Thunberg will go on permanent display in downtown Fargo in March 2020.

Standing for Us All was featured in National Geographic Magazine on October 28, 2020.

See also
 Albumen print
 Calotype
 Daguerreotype

Books
Northern Plains Native Americans: A Modern Wet Plate Perspective - Vol.1, Glitterati Incorporated, New York, NY, 2019, 
Northern Plains Native Americans: A Modern Wet Plate Perspective - Vol.2, Nostalgic Glass Wet Plate Studio, Bismarck, ND, 2022,

References

External links
 

Living people
1969 births
People from Bismarck, North Dakota
American portrait photographers
21st-century American photographers
21st-century American male artists
Photographers from North Dakota